"Every Day Hurts" is a song by British band Sad Café, from their third album Facades. It was released as a single in 1979 and became their biggest hit, reaching No. 3 on the UK Singles Chart, with a total of 12 weeks on the chart.

"Every Day Hurts" was among the top 20 best-selling singles in Britain in 1979, outselling multiple UK number one hits that year.

Track listing
UK 7" single
A. "Every Day Hurts"
B. "Wish This Night Would Never End"

Charts

References

1979 songs
1979 singles
1970s ballads
Sad Café (band) songs
RCA Records singles
Song recordings produced by Eric Stewart